Iberodon is a small, extinct mammal of the Lower Cretaceous from Portugal. It was a member of the also extinct order Multituberculata, and led its obscure and plant-eating existence in the company of dinosaurs. It lies within the suborder "Plagiaulacida" and family Pinheirodontidae.

The genus Iberodon was named by Hahn G. and Hahn R. in 1999 based on a single species. The species, known  as Iberodon quadrituberculatus, is known from teeth found in Berriasian (Lower Cretaceous)-age strata of Portugal.

References 
 Zofia Kielan-Jaworowska, Richard L. Cifelli, and Zhe-Xi Luo (2005). "Mammals from the age of dinosaurs : origins, evolution, and structure" pp. 314. 
 Hahn & Hahn (1999), "Pinheirodontidae n. fam. (Multituberculata) (Mammalia) aus der tiefen Unter-Kreide Portugals". Palaeontographica Abt. A Vol. 253, pp. 77–222. (Pinheirodontidae n. fam. (Multituberculata) (Mammalia) from the deepest Lower Cretaceous of Portugal).
 Kielan-Jaworowska Z & Hurum JH (2001), "Phylogeny and Systematics of multituberculate mammals". Paleontology 44, p. 389-429.
 Much of this information has been derived from  MESOZOIC MAMMALS: Basal Multituberculata, an Internet directory.

Multituberculates
Early Cretaceous mammals of Europe
Fossils of Portugal
Prehistoric mammal genera
Fossil taxa described in 1999